Rodrigo Ivan Gómez Gómez (born March 24, 1981 in Montevideo) is a Uruguayan footballer who last played for Montevideo City Torque as a defender.

External links
 Profile at soccerway
 Profile at ceroacero

1981 births
Living people
Footballers from Montevideo
Uruguayan footballers
Association football defenders
Cypriot First Division players
Rampla Juniors players
Defensor Sporting players
Club San José players
Ermis Aradippou FC players
Uruguayan expatriate footballers
Expatriate footballers in Cyprus
Expatriate footballers in Bolivia